Glen Weldon is an American writer, cultural critic, and podcaster. He has written for publications such as The Washington Post, The New York Times, Slate, The Atlantic, and McSweeney's. Weldon currently writes for the NPR Arts Desk and is a panelist on the podcast Pop Culture Happy Hour.

Career 
Weldon currently writes for the NPR Arts Desk and is a panelist on the podcast Pop Culture Happy Hour with Linda Holmes, Stephen Thompson, and Aisha Harris.

In his work, Weldon often draws on his life experience as a gay man and a self-described "nerd". In addition to shorter fiction work appearing in anthologies and publications, he is the author of two non-fiction pop culture histories about comic book superheroes and nerd culture. Superman: The Unauthorized Biography, published in 2013, chronicled the history of Superman and his role as an iconic American figure. 2016's The Caped Crusade covered Batman's relevance through decades of popular culture.

Weldon has earned an Arts Journalism Fellowship from the National Endowment for the Arts, a Pew Fellowship in the Arts for Fiction, a Ragdale Writing Fellowship, and an Amtrak Writers' Residency.

Personal life
Weldon grew up in West Chester, Pennsylvania. He attended Southampton College and graduated with a degree in marine biology. On his NPR bio page, it is stated that he was "a completely inept marine biologist and a slightly better-ept competitive swimmer."

Works 
 Superman: The Unauthorized Biography. 
 The Caped Crusade: Batman and the Rise of Nerd Culture. 
 "Of MSE-6 and Men" short story in From a Certain Point of View

References

External links
 

Living people
21st-century American writers
American film critics
American podcasters
American television critics
NPR personalities
Pew Fellows in the Arts
American gay writers
Southampton College alumni
Year of birth missing (living people)